William Ben Hogan (August 13, 1912 – July 25, 1997) was an American professional golfer who is generally considered to be one of the greatest players in the history of the game. He is notable for his profound influence on golf swing theory and his ball-striking ability.

Hogan's nine career professional major championships tie him with Gary Player for fourth all-time, trailing only Jack Nicklaus (18), Tiger Woods (15) and Walter Hagen (11). He is one of only five players to have won all four majors: the Masters Tournament, The Open Championship (despite only playing once), the U.S. Open, and the PGA Championship. The other four are Nicklaus, Woods, Player, and Gene Sarazen; Hogan's first major win came at age 34.

Early life and character
Hogan was born in Stephenville, Texas, the third and youngest child of Chester and Clara (Williams) Hogan. When Hogan was nine years old in 1922, his father Chester committed suicide with a self-inflicted gunshot at the family home. By some accounts, Chester committed suicide in front of him, which some (including Hogan biographer James Dodson) have cited as the cause of his introverted personality in later years.

The family incurred financial difficulties after his father's suicide, and the children took jobs to help their seamstress mother make ends meet. Older brother Royal quit school at age 14 to deliver office supplies by bicycle, and nine-year-old Ben sold newspapers after school at the nearby train station. A tip from a friend led him to caddying at age eleven at Glen Garden Country Club, a nine-hole course  to the south. One of his fellow caddies at Glen Garden was Byron Nelson, later a tour rival. The two would tie for the lead at the annual Christmas caddie tournament in December 1927, when both were fifteen. Nelson sank a  putt to tie on the ninth and final hole. Instead of sudden death, they played another nine holes; Nelson sank another substantial putt on the final green to win by a stroke.

The following spring, Nelson was granted the only junior membership offered by the members of Glen Garden. Club rules did not allow caddies age 16 and older, so after August 1928, Hogan took his game to three scrubby daily-fee courses: Katy Lake, Worth Hills, and Z-Boaz.

Turns professional
Hogan dropped out of Central High School during the final semester of his senior year. He turned pro in the golf industry six months shy of his 18th birthday at the Texas Open in San Antonio, in late January 1930. Hogan met Valerie Fox in Sunday school in Fort Worth in the mid-1920s, and they reacquainted in 1932 when he landed a low-paying club pro job in Cleburne, where her family had moved. They married in April 1935 at her parents' home.

Hogan's early years as a pro were very difficult; he went broke more than once. He did not win his first tournament (as an individual) until March 1940, when he won three consecutive events in North Carolina at age 27. Although it took a decade for Hogan to secure his first victory, his wife Valerie believed in him, and this helped see him through the tough years when he battled a hook that he later cured.

Despite finishing 13th on the money list in 1938, Hogan took an assistant pro job at Century Country Club in Purchase, New York. He worked at Century as an assistant and then as the head pro until 1941, when he took the head pro job at Hershey Country Club in Hershey, Pennsylvania.

Career-threatening accident
During Hogan's prime years of 1938 through 1959, he won 63 professional golf tournaments despite the interruption of his career by World War II and a near-fatal car accident. Hogan served in the U.S. Army Air Forces from March 1943 to June 1945; he was stationed locally at Fort Worth and became a utility pilot with the rank of lieutenant.

Driving home to Fort Worth after a Monday playoff loss at the 1949 Phoenix Open, Hogan and his wife Valerie survived a head-on collision with a Greyhound bus east of Van Horn, Texas. On the morning of Wednesday, February 2, Hogan had reduced his speed in the limited visibility ground fog; the bus was attempting to pass another vehicle on a narrow bridge, which left no place to avoid the crash. Hogan threw himself across Valerie to protect her. He would have been killed had he not done so, because the steering column punctured the driver's seat of their new Cadillac sedan.

This accident left Hogan, age 36, with a double-fracture of the pelvis, a fractured collar bone, a left ankle fracture, a chipped rib, and near-fatal blood clots: he would suffer lifelong circulation problems and other physical limitations. His doctors said he might never walk again, let alone play golf competitively. While Hogan was in the hospital in El Paso, his life was endangered by a blood clot problem that led doctors to tie off the vena cava. He left the hospital on the first of April, 59 days after the accident, and returned to Fort Worth by train.

Hogan regained his strength by extensive walking and resumed his golf activities  in November 1949. He returned to the PGA Tour to start the 1950 season at the Los Angeles Open, where he tied with Sam Snead over 72 holes, but lost the 18-hole playoff, held over a week later (due to course conditions).

The "Triple Crown" season
The win at Carnoustie was only a part of Hogan's watershed 1953 season, a year in which he won five of the six tournaments he entered, including three major championships (a feat known as the Triple Crown of Golf).

It still stands among the greatest single seasons in the history of professional golf. Hogan, 40, was unable to enter—and possibly win—the 1953 PGA Championship (to complete the Grand Slam) because its play (July 1–7) overlapped the play of The Open at Carnoustie (July 6–10), which he won. It was the only time that a golfer had won three major professional championships in a year until Tiger Woods won the final three majors in 2000 (and the first in 2001).

Hogan often declined to play in the PGA Championship; he skipped it more and more often as his career wore on. There were two reasons for this. First, the PGA Championship was, until 1958, a match play event, and Hogan's particular skill was "shooting a number"—meticulously planning and executing a strategy to achieve a score for a round on a particular course (even to the point of leaving out the 7-iron in the U.S. Open at Merion, saying "there are no 7-iron shots at Merion"). Second, the PGA required several days of 36 holes per day competition, and after his 1949 auto accident, Hogan struggled to manage more than 18 holes a day.

After the win at Carnoustie, Hogan and his wife Valerie were passengers on the  westbound to New York City, where he received a ticker tape parade down Broadway on July 21.

Hogan's golf swing
Ben Hogan is widely acknowledged to be one of the greatest ball strikers who ever played golf. Although he had a formidable record with 64 PGA tour victories, it is Hogan's ball-striking ability that mostly underpins his modern reputation.

Hogan was known to practice more than any of his contemporary golfers and is said to have "invented practice". On this matter, Hogan himself said, "You hear stories about me beating my brains out practicing, but... I was enjoying myself. I couldn't wait to get up in the morning, so I could hit balls. When I'm hitting the ball where I want, hard and crisply, it's a joy that very few people experience." He was also one of the first players to match particular clubs to yardages, or reference points around the course such as bunkers or trees, to improve his distance control.

Hogan thought that an individual's golf swing was "in the dirt" and that mastering it required plenty of practice and repetition. He is also known to have spent years contemplating the golf swing, trying a range of theories and methods before arriving at the finished method which brought him his greatest period of success.

The young Hogan was badly afflicted by hooking the golf ball. Although slight of build at 5'8½" and 145 pounds – attributes that earned him the nickname "Bantam", which he thoroughly disliked – he was long off the tee early in his career. Like many professional golfers of his day, he competed in long drive contests as well as matchplay and strokeplay events.

It has been alleged that Hogan used a "strong" grip, with hands more the right of the club grip in tournament play prior to his accident in 1949, despite often practicing with a "weak" grip, with the back of the left wrist facing the target, and that this limited his success, or, at least, his reliability, up to that date. Jacobs alleges that Byron Nelson told him this information, and furthermore that Hogan developed and used the "strong" grip as a boy to be able to hit the ball as far as bigger, stronger contemporaries. This strong grip is what resulted in Hogan hitting the odd disastrous snap hook.

Hogan's late swing produced the famed "Hogan Fade" ball flight, lower than usual for a great player and from left to right. This ball flight was the result of his using a "draw" type swing in conjunction with a "weak" grip, a combination that all but negated the chance of hitting a hook.

Hogan played and practiced golf with only bare hands, i.e., without wearing gloves. Moe Norman did the same, playing and practicing without gloves. The two were arguably the greatest ball strikers golf has ever known; even Tiger Woods quoted them as the only players ever to have "owned their swings", in that they had total control of it and, as a result, the ball's flight.

In May 1967, the editor of Cary Middlecoff's 1974 book The Golf Swing watched every shot that 54-year-old Hogan hit in the Colonial National Invitational in Fort Worth, Texas. "Hogan shot 281 for a third-place tie with George Archer. Of the 281 shots, 141 were taken in reaching the greens. Of the 141, 139 were rated from well-executed to superbly executed. The remaining two were a drive that missed the fairway by some 5 yards and a 5-iron to a par-3 hole that missed the green by about the same distance. It was difficult, if not impossible to conceive of anybody hitting the ball better over a four-day span."

Hogan's secret
In the spring of 1953, Hogan announced he had discovered a "secret" that made his swing nearly automatic. There are many theories as to its exact nature. The earliest theory is that the "secret" was a special wrist movement known as "cupping under". This information was revealed in a 1955 Life magazine article. However, many believed Hogan did not reveal all that he knew at the time. It has since been alleged in Golf Digest magazine, and by Jody Vasquez in his book "Afternoons With Mr Hogan", that the second element of Hogan's "secret" was the way in which he used his right knee to initiate the swing and that this right knee movement was critical to the correct operation of the wrist.

Hogan revealed later in life that the "secret" involved cupping the left wrist at the top of the backswing and using a weaker left-hand grip (thumb more on top of the grip as opposed to on the right side).

Hogan did this to prevent himself from ever hooking the ball off the tee. By positioning his hands in this manner, he ensured that the club face would be slightly open upon impact, creating a fade (left to right ball flight) as opposed to a draw or hook (right to left ball flight).

Hand dominance
Many believed that although he played right-handed as an adult, Hogan was actually left-handed. In his book "Five Lessons," in the chapter entitled "The Grip," Hogan said "I was born left-handed -- that was the normal way for me to do things. I was switched over to doing things right-handed when I was a boy but I started golf as a left-hander because the first club I ever came into possession of, an old five-iron, was a left-handed stick." This belief also seemed to be corroborated by Hogan himself in his earlier book "Power Golf." However, some mystery still remains about this since Hogan in subsequent interviews said that the belief of his being left-handed was actually a myth (noted in what was probably his last video interview and in his 1987 Golf Magazine interview).

In these interviews Hogan said that he was indeed a right-handed player who early on practiced/played with a left-hand club that had been given to him because it was all that he had and that it was this issue that brought about the myth that he was left-handed. This may be the reason that his early play with right-handed equipment found him using a cross-handed grip (right hand at the end of the club, left hand below it). In "The Search for the Perfect Golf Swing", researchers Cochran and Stobbs held the opinion that a left-handed person playing right-handed would be prone to hook the ball.

Famous 1-iron shot
Hy Peskin, a staff photographer for Sports Illustrated, took a famous photo of Ben Hogan playing a 1-iron shot to the green at the 72nd hole of the 1950 U.S. Open. It was ranked by Sports Illustrated as one of the greatest sports photographs of the 20th century.

"Five Lessons" and golf instruction
Hogan believed that a solid, repeatable golf swing involved only a few essential elements, which, when performed correctly and in sequence, were the essence of the swing. His book Five Lessons: The Modern Fundamentals of Golf (written with Herbert Warren Wind) is perhaps the most widely read golf tutorial ever written, although Harvey Penick's Little Red Book would also have a claim to that title, and the principles therein are often parroted by modern "swing gurus". In the Five Lessons, Hogan breaks down the swing into four parts: The Fundamentals, The Grip, Stance and Posture, and The Swing.

"The Fundamentals"
Hogan explains that the average golfer underestimates himself.  He believes that beginners place too much emphasis on the long game. If you have a correct, powerful and repeating swing, then you can shoot in the 70s. "The average golfer is entirely capable of building a repeating swing and breaking 80." Through years of trial and error, Ben has developed techniques that have proved themselves under various types of pressure.

"The Grip"
Hogan says, "Good golf begins with a good grip." Without a good grip, one cannot play to his or her potential.  The grip is important because it is the only direct physical contact you have with the ball via your golf club.  A bad grip can cause dipping of the hands at the top of the swing and a decrease in club head speed.  This can cause a loss of power and accuracy. The following describes the perfect golf grip in the eyes of Mr. Hogan:

"With the back of your left hand facing the target, place the club in the left hand so that, 1) The shaft is pressed up under the muscular pad at the inside heel of the palm, and 2) The shaft also lies directly across the top joint of the forefinger".

"Crook the forefinger around the shaft and you will discover that you can lift the club and maintain a fairly firm grip on it by supporting it just with the muscles of that finger and the muscles of the pad of the palm."

"Now just close the left hand-close the fingers before you close the thumb-and the club will be just where it should be."

"To gain a real acquaintance with this preparatory guide to correct gripping, I would suggest practicing it five or 10 minutes a day for a week until it begins to become second nature."

"To obtain the proper grip with the right hand, hold it somewhat extended, with the palm facing your target. Now-your left hand is already correctly affixed-place the club in your right hand so that the shaft lies across the top joint of the four fingers and definitely below the palm."

"The right hand is a finger grip.  The two fingers which should apply most of the pressure are the two middle fingers."

"Now with the club held firmly on the fingers of your right hand, simply fold your right hand over your left thumb."

"Stance and Posture"
The right stance not only allows for proper alignment, but also for a balanced swing, prepared usage of the proper muscles, and the maximum strength and control over your swing.  We align our body to the target only after we have aligned the club head to the target. 
A proper stance starts with your feet being aligned at the target, followed by your knees, hips and shoulders. Your feet should be shoulder width apart, your front foot should be slightly opened towards the target and your back foot should be perpendicular to the target.  As you increase in club, your stance should widen for further stability.  Your shoulders will be naturally open to the target line because your arms are not at equal length while holding the club.  Make sure to close your shoulders slightly to stay aligned with the target line.  The proper stance affects how controlled the backswing is, governs the amount of hip turn in the backswing, and allows for the hips to clear through the downswing.  Your front arm should be extended at all times to allow the club to travel in its maximum arc.

"The elbows should be tucked in, not stuck out from the body.  At address, the left elbow should point directly at the left hipbone and the right elbow should point directly at the right hipbone.  Furthermore, there should be a sense of fixed jointness between the two forearms and the wrists, and it should be maintained throughout the swing."

"You should bend your knees from the thighs down.  As your knees bend, the upper part of the trunk remains normally erect, just as it does when you sit down in a chair. In golf, the sit-down motion is more like lowering yourself onto a spectator-sports-stick.  Think of the seat of the stick as being about two inches or so below your buttocks."

"The Swing"

"The Backswing"
Hogan advocates the use of a waggle not only because it helps you loosen your muscles, but also because it allows for your hands and arms to remember where to go for the first part of your backswing. The angle of the swing should feel like you are swinging under a slanting plane of glass.  The "glass" has a hole for your head while it rests on your shoulders and touches the ground on top of your ball. Also, the backswing should be slightly steeper than the downswing.  At the top of your backswing, your back should be facing the target.

"On the backswing, the order of movement goes like this: hands, arms, shoulders, hips."

"Actually, the hands start the club head back a split second before the arms start back.  And the arms begin their movement a split second before the shoulders begin to turn."

"Just before your hands reach hip level, the shoulders, as they turn, automatically start pulling the hips around.   As the hips begin to turn, they pull the left leg in to the right."

"When you have turned your shoulders all the way, your back should face squarely toward your target."

"When you finish your backswing, your chin should be hitting against the top of your left shoulder."

"As you begin the backswing, you must restrain your hips from moving until the turning of the shoulders starts to pull the hips around…It is this increased tension that unwinds the upper part of the body.  It unwinds the shoulder, the arms and the hands in that order, the correct order.  It helps the swing so much it makes it almost automatic."

"If he executes his backswing properly, as his arms are approaching hip level, they should be parallel with the plane and they should remain parallel with the plane, just beneath the glass, till they reach the top of the backswing.  At the top of his backswing, his left arm should be extended at the exact same angle (to the ball) as the glass."

"The Downswing"
Hogan believes the second part of the swing, the downswing, is initiated by the hips starting to turn.  A baseball player throws a ball by transferring his weight and rotates his hips.  Then his shoulders and arm follow after.  Hogan thinks that the downswing is very similar to this action.  The downswing is at a slightly shallower angle and therefore the arms and hands should come from the inside-out on the downswing.  The club head reaches its maximum speed, not at impact, but right after, when both arms are fully extended.

"At impact the back of the left hand faces toward your target.  The wrist bone is definitely raised.  It points to the target and, at the moment the ball is contacted, it is out in front, nearer to the target than any part of the hand."

"At impact the right arm is still bent slightly."

"At that point just beyond impact where both arms are straight and extended the club head reaches its maximum speed."

"The hips lead the shoulders all the way on the downswing."

The Five Lessons were initially released as a five-part series in Sports Illustrated magazine, beginning with the issue of March 11, 1957. It was compiled and printed in book form later that year and is currently in its 64th printing. Even today it continues to maintain a place at or near the top of the Amazon.com golf book sales rankings. The book was co-authored by Herbert Warren Wind, and illustrated by artist Anthony Ravielli.

Playing style
Hogan is widely acknowledged to have been one of the finest ball strikers that ever played the game.

Hogan's ball striking has also been described as being of near miraculous caliber by other very knowledgeable observers such as Jack Nicklaus, who only saw him play some years after his prime. Nicklaus once responded to the question, "Is Tiger Woods the best ball striker you have ever seen?" with, "No, no - Ben Hogan, easily".

Further testimony to Hogan's (and Moe Norman's) status among top golfers is provided by Tiger Woods, who said that he wished to "own his (golf) swing" in the same way as Moe Norman and Hogan had. Woods claimed that this pair were the only players ever to have "owned their swings", in that they had total control of it and, as a result, of the ball's flight.

By most accounts, Ben Hogan was the best golfer of his era and still stands as one of the greatest of all time. "The Hawk" possessed fierce determination and an iron will, which combined with his unquestionable golf skills, formed an aura that could intimidate opponents into competitive submission. In Scotland, Hogan was known as "The Wee Ice Man", or, in some versions, "Wee Ice Mon," a moniker earned during his famous British Open victory at Carnoustie in 1953. It is a reference to his steely and seemingly nerveless demeanor, itself a product of a golf swing he had built that was designed to perform better the more pressure he put it under. Hogan rarely spoke during competition, and mostly kept to himself. Hogan was also highly respected by fellow competitors for his superb course management skills. During his peak years, he rarely if ever attempted a shot in competition which he had not thoroughly honed in practice.

Although his ball striking was perhaps the greatest ever, Hogan's putting skills are thought to have been below average, though he was capable of putting very well. Solid and sometimes spectacular in his early and peak years, Hogan by his later years deteriorated to the point of being an often poor putter by professional standards, particularly on slow greens. The majority of his putting problems developed after his 1949 car accident, which nearly blinded his left eye and impaired his depth perception.  Toward the end of his career, he often stood over the ball inordinately long before drawing his putter back.

While he suffered from the "yips" in his later years, Hogan was known as an effective putter from mid to short range on quick, U.S. Open style surfaces at times during his career.

Career and records

Ben Hogan won ten tournaments in 1948 alone, including the U.S. Open at Riviera Country Club, a course known as "Hogan's Alley" because of his success there. His 8-under par score in 1948 set a U.S. Open record that was matched only by Jack Nicklaus in 1980, Hale Irwin in 1990, and Lee Janzen in 1993. It was not broken until Tiger Woods shot  par in 2000 (Jim Furyk also shot  par in the 2003, Rory McIlroy set the current record with 16-under par in 2011, which was matched by Brooks Koepka in 2017).

Hogan remains the only player to win at least 10 PGA tour events in a year twice (13 in 1946 and 10 in 1948). Hogan owns the longest streaks of consecutive major attempts finishing in both the top 5 with 12 (1940–1947) and the top 10 with 18 (1948–1956). He is the only player to win as many as 8 majors in as few as 11 attempts (1948–1953). Hogan owns the longest streak of consecutive U.S Open attempts finishing in the top 10 with 16 (1940–1960). The next longest streak is 7. Hogan is one of only two players to win 3 consecutive U.S. Opens in 3 attempts (the other is Willie Anderson). Hogan finished in the top 10 in 12 consecutive U. S. Open attempts (1941–1956) which is the longest such streak in Open history. He achieved this on 12 different courses and won 5 times.

Colonial Country Club in Fort Worth, a modern PGA Tour tournament venue, is also known as "Hogan's Alley" and may have the better claim to the nickname as he won its tour event five times. It was his home course after his retirement, and he was an active member of Colonial as well for many years. The sixth hole at Carnoustie, a par five on which Hogan took a famously difficult line off the tee during each of his rounds in the 1953 Open Championship, was renamed Hogan's Alley in 2003 during a ceremony celebrating the 50th anniversary of Hogan's Open victory at Carnoustie.

Prior to the 1949 accident, Hogan never truly captured the hearts of his galleries, despite being one of the best golfers of his time. Perhaps this was due to his perceived cold and aloof on-course persona. But when Hogan shocked and amazed the golf world by returning to tournament golf only eleven months after his accident, and took second place in the 1950 Los Angeles Open after a playoff loss to Sam Snead, he was cheered on by ecstatic fans. "His legs simply were not strong enough to carry his heart any longer," famed sportswriter Grantland Rice said of Hogan's near-miss. However, he proved to his critics (and to himself, especially) that he could still win by completing his famous comeback five months later, defeating Lloyd Mangrum and George Fazio in an 18-hole playoff at Merion near Philadelphia to win his second U.S. Open title.

Hogan went on to achieve what is perhaps the greatest sporting accomplishment in history, limping to twelve more PGA Tour wins (including six majors) before retiring. In 1951, Hogan entered just five events, but won three of them – the Masters, U.S. Open, and World Championship of Golf, and finished second and fourth in his other two starts. He finished fourth on that season's money list, barely $6,000 behind the season's official money list leader Lloyd Mangrum, who played over twenty events. That year also saw the release of a biopic starring Glenn Ford as Hogan, called Follow the Sun: The Ben Hogan Story. He even received a ticker-tape parade in New York City in 1953, upon his return from winning the British Open, the only time he played the event. With that victory, Hogan became just the second player, after Gene Sarazen, to win all four of the modern major championships—the Masters, U.S. Open, British Open, and PGA Championship.

Hogan remains the only player to win the Masters, U.S. Open, and British Open in the same calendar year (1953). His 14-under par at the 1953 Masters set a record that stood for a dozen years; as of 2018, he remains one of just twelve (Jack Nicklaus, Raymond Floyd, Ben Crenshaw, Tiger Woods, David Duval, Phil Mickelson, Charl Schwartzel, Jordan Spieth, Justin Rose, Rickie Fowler, and Patrick Reed) to have recorded such a low score in the tournament. In 1967, at age 54, Hogan shot a record 30 on the back nine at the Masters; the record stood until 1992.

In 1945, Hogan set a PGA Tour record for a 72-hole event at the Portland Open Invitational by shooting 27-under-par. The record stood until 1998, when it was broken by John Huston (it has since been surpassed by nine others, including most recently Phil Mickelson's 28-under in the 2013 Waste Management Phoenix Open).

Hogan never competed on the Senior PGA Tour, as that circuit did not exist until he was in his late sixties.

According to his PGA Tour profile, Hogan earned just $332,516 in official PGA events, however, a 2021 study concluded that Hogan's tournament performances could have earned him $91.8M if he had played in the modern era.

Five U.S. Opens?
Many supporters of Hogan and some golf historians feel that his victory at the Hale America Open in 1942 should be counted as his fifth U.S. Open and 10th major championship, since the tournament was to be a substitute for the Open after its cancellation by the USGA. The Hale America National Open was held in the same time slot and was run like the U.S. Open with more than 1,500 entries, local qualifying at 69 sites and sectional qualifying at most major cities. The top players, who were not away fighting in World War II, participated and the largest purse of the year was awarded. Included in the field were the very top players of the day including Byron Nelson, Gene Sarazen, Jimmy Demaret, Lloyd Mangrum, and defending Open champion Craig Wood. The only player of that level who did not play was Sam Snead, but the field did also include Bobby Jones who had competed in his own Masters event in April of that year.

Distinctions and honors
A special room is dedicated to Hogan's career, comeback, and accomplishments at the United States Golf Association Museum and Arnold Palmer Center for Golf History in Far Hills, New Jersey.
He was inducted into the World Golf Hall of Fame in 1974. In 1976, Ben Hogan was voted the Bob Jones Award, the highest honor given by the United States Golf Association in recognition of distinguished sportsmanship in golf.
Hogan helped to design the original plans for the Trophy Club Country Club Golfcourse in Trophy Club and 18 of the course's 36 holes are designated as the "Hogan" Course.
Hogan played on two U.S. Ryder Cup teams, 1947 and 1951, and captained the team three times, 1947, 1949, and 1967, famously claiming on the last occasion to have brought the "twelve best golfers in the world" to play in the competition. (This line was used by subsequent Ryder Cup captain Raymond Floyd in 1989.  In 1989, playing at The Belfry, the two sides halved at 14 points each and Team Europe retained the cup.)
Hogan ranked 38th in ESPN's SportsCentury 50 Greatest Athletes of the 20th Century in 1999.
Hogan won the Vardon Trophy for lowest scoring average three times: 1940, 1941, and 1948. In 1953, Hogan won the Hickok Belt as the top professional athlete of the year in the United States.
In 2000, Hogan was ranked as the second greatest player of all time by Golf Digest magazine. Jack Nicklaus was first, and Sam Snead was third.
In 2009, Hogan was ranked as the fourth greatest player of all time by Golf Magazine. Jack Nicklaus was first, Tiger Woods was second, and Bobby Jones was third.
The Ben Hogan Award is given annually by the Golf Writers Association of America to a golfer who has stayed active in golf despite a physical handicap or serious illness. The first winner was Babe Zaharias.
The Ben Hogan Award is given by Friends of Golf and the Golf Coaches Association of America to the best college golf player since 1990.
The Ben Hogan Museum, located in Hogan's childhood hometown of Dublin, Texas, pays homage to the legendary golfer—the boy, the businessman, the golfer. It highlights his early experiences and their resulting impact on his private and professional life. As the son of the local blacksmith, Hogan learned from an early age the way metal could be forged to best accomplish specific tasks. He is thought to have used that knowledge to his advantage, later in life, as he went on to design and manufacture optimum golf equipment.

The Ben Hogan Golf Equipment Company
Following his most successful season, Hogan started his golf club company in the fall of 1953 in Fort Worth.  Production began in the summer of 1954, with clubs targeted toward "the better player." Always a perfectionist, Hogan is said to have ordered the entire first production run of clubs destroyed because they did not meet his exacting standards.

In 1960, he sold the company to American Machine and Foundry (AMF), but stayed on as chairman of the board for several more years. AMF Ben Hogan golf clubs were sold continuously from 1960 to 1985 when AMF was bought by Minstar who sold The Ben Hogan company in 1988 to Cosmo World, who owned the club manufacturer until 1992, when it was sold to another independent investor, Bill Goodwin.

Goodwin moved the company out of Fort Worth, and a union shop, to Virginia so it would be close to his home of operations for other AMF brands and, incidentally, a non-union shop in an effort to return the company to profitability. Goodwin sold to Spalding in 1997, closing the sale in January 1998. Spalding returned manufacturing to Hogan's Fort Worth before eventually including the company's assets in a bankruptcy sale of Spalding's Top Flite division to Callaway in 2004. After over a half century and numerous ownership changes, the Ben Hogan line was discontinued by Callaway in 2008. The brand name was sold to Perry Ellis International in 2012. In May 2014, Eidolon Brands approached Perry Ellis International and got the rights to use Ben Hogan's name for a line of golf clubs. The company ceased trading in 2022.

Ownership timeline
 1953 – company founded
 1960 – sold to AMF, Hogan retained as president
 1984 – sold to Irwin Jacobs for $15 million
 1988 – sold to Cosmo World of Japan for $55 million, initial sponsor of the Ben Hogan Tour from 1990 to 1992
 1992 – sold to Bill Goodwin of Richmond, Virginia
 1997 – sold to Spalding Top-Flite
 2003 – sold to Callaway Golf, Hogan line discontinued in 2008
 2012 – brand name sold to Perry Ellis International
 2014 – brand name licensed by Eldolon Brands, led by CEO Terry Koehler. Company failed late 2016
 2017 – Ben Hogan Golf Equipment Company re-emerged, funded by ExWorks Capital
 2022 – ceased trading

Death
Hogan died at age 84 in Fort Worth on July 25, 1997; his wife Valerie died two years later, and they are interred at Greenwood Memorial Park in Fort Worth.

Professional wins

PGA Tour wins (64)
1938 (1) Hershey Four-Ball (with Vic Ghezzi)
1940 (4) North and South Open, Greater Greensboro Open, Asheville Land of the Sky Open, Goodall Palm Beach Round Robin
1941 (5) Asheville Open, Chicago Open, Hershey Open, Miami Biltmore International Four-Ball (with Gene Sarazen), Inverness Invitational Four-Ball (with Jimmy Demaret)
1942 (6) Los Angeles Open, San Francisco Open, North and South Open, Asheville Land of the Sky Open, Hale America Open, Rochester Times-Union Open
1945 (5) Nashville Invitational, Portland Open Invitational, Richmond Invitational, Montgomery Invitational, Orlando Open
1946 (13) Phoenix Open, San Antonio Texas Open, St. Petersburg Open, Miami International Four-Ball (with Jimmy Demaret), Colonial National Invitation, Western Open, Goodall Round Robin, Inverness Invitational Four-Ball (with Jimmy Demaret), Winnipeg Open, PGA Championship, Golden State Open, Dallas Invitational, North and South Open
1947 (7) Los Angeles Open, Phoenix Open, Colonial National Invitation, Chicago Victory National Open, World Championship of Golf, Miami International Four-Ball (with Jimmy Demaret), Inverness Invitational Four-Ball (with Jimmy Demaret)
1948 (10) Los Angeles Open, PGA Championship, U.S. Open, Inverness Invitational Four-Ball (with Jimmy Demaret), Motor City Open, Reading Open, Western Open, Denver Open, Reno Open, Glendale Open
1949 (2) Bing Crosby Pro-Am, Long Beach Open
1950 (1) U.S. Open
1951 (3) Masters Tournament, U.S. Open, World Championship of Golf
1952 (1) Colonial National Invitation
1953 (5) Masters Tournament, Pan American Open, Colonial National Invitation, U.S. Open, The Open Championship
1959 (1) Colonial National Invitation

Major championships are shown in bold.

Source:

Other wins (9)
this list is probably incomplete
1936 Land of the Sky Open
1937 Land of the Sky Open
1940 Westchester Open, Westchester PGA Championship
1950 Greenbrier Pro-Am
1956 World Cup of Golf individual; World Cup of Golf team

Major championships

Wins (9)

Note: The PGA Championship was match play until 1958 
1Defeated Mangrum and Fazio in 18-hole playoff; Hogan 69 (−1), Mangrum 73 (+3), Fazio 75 (+5).

Results timeline

NT = no tournament
WD = Withdrew
CUT = missed the half-way cut (3rd round cut in 1960 PGA Championship)
R64, R32, R16, QF, SF = Round in which player lost in PGA Championship match play
"T" indicates a tie for a place

Summary

Longest streak of top-10s – 18 (1948 Masters – 1956 U.S. Open)
Most consecutive cuts made – 35 (1939 Masters – 1956 U.S. Open)

U.S. national team appearances
Professional
Ryder Cup: 1947 (winners, playing captain), 1949 (winners, non-playing captain), 1951 (winners), 1967 (winners, non-playing captain)
Canada Cup: 1956 (winners, individual winner), 1958

See also

Career Grand Slam Champions
List of golfers with most PGA Tour wins
List of golfers with most wins in one PGA Tour event
List of men's major championships winning golfers
Longest PGA Tour win streaks
Most PGA Tour wins in a year

References

Further reading
"Ben Hogan: "Players Were Afraid"" (1999). In ESPN SportsCentury. Michael MacCambridge, Editor. New York: Hyperion ESPN Books. pp. 142–3.

External links

Ben Hogan -  Photos by A Ravielli Taken For The Five Lessons of Golf
Ben Hogan - Daily Telegraph obituary

Ben Hogan's official site
Official Ben Hogan Museum

American male golfers
PGA Tour golfers
Winners of men's major golf championships
Ryder Cup competitors for the United States
Men's Career Grand Slam champion golfers
World Golf Hall of Fame inductees
Golf writers and broadcasters
Golfers from Texas
United States Army Air Forces personnel of World War II
United States Army Air Forces officers
Military personnel from Texas
People from Stephenville, Texas
Sportspeople from Fort Worth, Texas
1912 births
1997 deaths